Harris is an unincorporated community in Rutherford County, North Carolina, United States. Harris has a post office with ZIP code 28074.

References

Unincorporated communities in Rutherford County, North Carolina
Unincorporated communities in North Carolina